Delik Yarqan (also Romanized as Delīk Yārqān) is a village in Angut-e Gharbi Rural District, Anguti District, Germi County, Ardabil Province, Iran. At the 2006 census, its population was 53, in 12 families.

References 

Towns and villages in Germi County